Alain Connes (born 1 April 1947) is a French mathematician, and a theoretical physicist, known for his contributions to the study of operator algebras and noncommutative geometry. He was awarded the Fields Medal in 1982.

Career

Source:

Academic career timeline:

(1966–1970) – Bachelor's degree from the École Normale Supérieure (now part of Paris Sciences et Lettres University).

(1973) – doctorate from Pierre and Marie Curie University, Paris, France

(1970–1974) – appointment at the French National Centre for Scientific Research, Paris

(1975) – Queen's University at Kingston, Ontario, Canada 

(1976–1980) – the University of Paris VI

(1979 – present) – the Institute of Advanced Scientific Studies, Bures-sur-Yvette, France

(1981–1984) – the French National Centre for Scientific Research, Paris

(2003–2011) – Vanderbilt University, Nashville, Tennessee

(2012–2020) – the Ohio State University, Columbus

Research
Connes studies operator algebras. In his early work on von Neumann algebras in the 1970s, he succeeded in obtaining the almost complete classification of injective factors. He also formulated the Connes embedding problem. Following this, he made contributions in operator K-theory and index theory, which culminated in the Baum–Connes conjecture. He also introduced cyclic cohomology in the early 1980s as a first step in the study of noncommutative differential geometry. He was a member of Nicolas Bourbaki.

Connes has applied his work in areas of mathematics and theoretical physics, including number theory, differential geometry and particle physics.

Awards and honours

Connes was awarded the Fields Medal in 1982, the Crafoord Prize in 2001 and the gold medal of the French National Centre for Scientific Research in 2004.  He was an invited speaker at the International Congress of Mathematicians (ICM) in 1974 at Vancouver and in 1986 at Berkeley, and a plenary speaker at the ICM in 1978 at Helsinki. He is a member of the French Academy of Sciences and several foreign academies and societies, including the Royal Danish and Norwegian Academies of Science and Letters, and the Russian and US National Academies of Sciences.

Books
 Alain Connes and Matilde Marcolli, Noncommutative Geometry, Quantum Fields and Motives, Colloquium Publications, American Mathematical Society, 2007,  
 Alain Connes, André Lichnerowicz, and Marcel-Paul Schutzenberger, Triangle of Thought, translated by Jennifer Gage, American Mathematical Society, 2001, 
 Jean-Pierre Changeux, and Alain Connes, Conversations on Mind, Matter, and Mathematics, translated by M. B. DeBevoise, Princeton University Press, 1998, 
 Alain Connes, Noncommutative Geometry, Academic Press, 1994,

See also
 Bost–Connes system
 Cyclic category
 Cyclic homology
 Factor (functional analysis)
 Higgs boson
 C*-algebra
 Noncommutative quantum field theory
 M-theory
 Groupoid
 Spectral triple
Criticism of non-standard analysis
 Riemann hypothesis

References

External links
 Alain Connes Official Web Site containing downloadable papers, and his book Non-commutative geometry, .
 
 Alain Connes' Standard Model
 An interview with Alain Connes and a discussion about it
 
 
 

1947 births
Living people
20th-century French mathematicians
Foreign associates of the National Academy of Sciences
21st-century French mathematicians
Academic staff of the Collège de France
Institute for Advanced Study visiting scholars
Fields Medalists
Mathematical analysts
Differential geometers
École Normale Supérieure alumni
Vanderbilt University faculty
Foreign Members of the Russian Academy of Sciences
Members of the French Academy of Sciences
Members of the Norwegian Academy of Science and Letters
Members of the Royal Danish Academy of Sciences and Letters
Clay Research Award recipients